In mathematics, global analysis, also called analysis on manifolds, is the study of the global and topological properties of differential equations on manifolds and vector bundles.  Global analysis uses techniques in infinite-dimensional manifold theory and topological spaces of mappings to classify behaviors of differential equations, particularly nonlinear differential equations. These spaces can include singularities and hence catastrophe theory is a part of global analysis. Optimization problems, such as finding geodesics on Riemannian manifolds, can be solved using differential equations so that the calculus of variations overlaps with global analysis. Global analysis finds application in physics in the study of dynamical systems and topological quantum field theory.

Journals 

 Annals of Global Analysis and Geometry
 The Journal of Geometric Analysis

See also 

 Atiyah–Singer index theorem
 Geometric analysis
 Lie groupoid
 Pseudogroup
 Morse theory
 Structural stability
 Harmonic map

References

Further reading 

 Mathematics 241A: Introduction to Global Analysis

Fields of mathematical analysis
Manifolds